Jackson Wang (born 28 March 1994) is a Hong Kong rapper, singer, dancer, record producer, fashion designer, and music video director. He is the founder of record label Team Wang and is the creative director and lead designer for fashion brand Team Wang Design. Born and raised in Hong Kong, Wang initially gained widespread recognition after joining JYP Entertainment's K-pop boy group, Got7, in 2014. In 2017, he founded Team Wang and began releasing solo music in China and internationally thereafter. His first solo album, Mirrors, debuted in 2019 and reached number 32 on the Billboard 200 in the United States, his second album Magic Man surpassing it in 2022 by landing at number 15 on the chart. In 2021, Wang left JYP Entertainment and formed the Chinese hip hop group, Panthepack, under Team Wang. Prior to his music career, Wang was a sabre fencer and competed in numerous domestic and international competitions. Wang was featured in the Forbes China Celebrity 100 list and ranked 10th in 2021.

Life and career

1994–2016: Early life and debut with Got7 

Wang was born in Hong Kong on 28 March 1994. He was raised by two athletic parents: fencer Wang Ruiji and gymnast Sophia Chow. Wang started his fencing training at the age of ten. He went on to win multiple awards as part of the Hong Kong national fencing team, including first place at the Asian Junior and Cadet Fencing Championship in 2011.

In 2010, while playing basketball at his school, Wang was noted by a representative of South Korean talent agency JYP Entertainment and invited to participate in the global auditions in Kowloon. In December 2010, it was announced that he passed the audition, ranking first out of 2,000 applicants. While preparing for the 2012 London Olympics, he was offered a scholarship to attend Stanford University for fencing, but turned it down as a result of the successful audition. In July 2011, Wang moved to Seoul, South Korea for his K-pop training. He made an appearance on the reality survival program Win: Who Is Next two years later. The program was a competition between YG Entertainment trainees (who later debuted as members of Winner and iKon), and JYP trainees. Wang appeared alongside fellow trainees Mark, Yugyeom, and BamBam, who were then selected as members of Got7. The group released its first single, "Girls Girls Girls," of its debut EP Got It? on 16 January 2014.

In 2014, Wang joined his first variety show, SBS' Roommate, as a member in its second season. Wang's individual popularity rose after he appeared on the series, and he was later awarded the Newcomer Award at the 2014 SBS Entertainment Awards. He subsequently appeared on several other Korean variety shows such as Star King, Law of the Jungle, Happy Together, Radio Star, Problematic Men, Our Neighborhood Arts and Physical Education, Saturday Night Live Korea, A Look At Myself, and others. On 12 May 2015, Wang was appointed as a new MC for SBS' music show Inkigayo, following the departure of ZE:A's Kwanghee.

In December 2015, Wang made his Chinese television debut as one of the presenters (alongside He Jiong) on the Chinese version of the show Please Take Care of My Refrigerator, called Go Fridge, which was well received. He also wrote the lyrics, composed, and arranged the theme song for the show in seasons 2 and 3. In March 2016, Wang was appointed as MC for Fresh Sunday, a show on Hunan TV.

On 29 April 2016, Got7 held their first concert in Seoul, where Wang performed his self-composed songs "I Love It" and "WOLO (We Only Live Once)" with his group members Yugyeom and BamBam. In November 2017, prior to the release of Got7 second Japanese extended play "Turn Up", Wang dropped out of all group activities in Japan due to health concerns and conflicting schedules. In December 2016 Wang's first solo commercial for Midea was released in China. In July 2016, Wang appeared on the Chinese reality TV series, Fighting Man. In December of that year, he was named Variety Star of the Year at the Tencent Variety Show Star Awards.

2017–2020: Early musical releases and Mirrors 
In January 2017, Wang was awarded the Popular Artist of the Year award at the Sina Weibo Awards. On 26 June 2017, JYP Entertainment announced the release of Wang's first solo album in China, as well as the establishment of a dedicated management team, named Team Wang, for his activities in China. Wang also established Snake or the Rabbit, which is a distribution company based in the United States, as partnership with Team Wang. In July 2017, Wang was awarded the MTV Special Award at the Asian Music Gala in Guangzhou. His first single, an English language track titled "Papillon", was released on 26 August and debuted at No. 1 on Billboard's China V Chart on the week of 16 September; moreover, on 30 August, he released "Novoland: The Castle in the Sky", the theme song for iOS game Novoland: The Castle in the Sky 3D, breaking away from hip-hop and making a first try with melodious and classical music. After establishing his own studio in China, Wang began endorsing beverages, clothing brands and electronics, which include Pepsi, Snow Beer, VIVO X21, Adidas, Douyin Application, Lenovo in China, and Hogan in Hong Kong.

Wang attended the 2017 MTV Europe Music Awards as an Ambassador of Great China on 12 November. On 13 November, he was appointed as Alibaba Group Tmall Global's Chief Wonderful Goods Officer. That month, he also attended the American Music Awards. On 30 November, he released his second solo single, "OKAY": similar to "Papillon", he wrote the lyrics, and composed and arranged the song together with Boytoy. In December of that year, he was named the Breakthrough Singer of the Year at the Tencent Video Star Awards.

On 9 February 2018, Wang was appointed as envoy of Hong Kong Tourism. On 20 April, he released his third self-written single, "Dawn of Us", an English song once again composed and arranged in collaboration with Boytoy. While "Papillon" dealt with the theme of self-struggle and "OKAY" described self-love, the track exhorts to appreciate the present and live with enthusiasm. The duo paired up again for "Fendiman", a collaboration with Fendi China. The song appeared at number one on both the iTunes Singles chart and the iTunes Pop chart in the United States, making Jackson Wang the first Chinese solo artist to achieve that feat. "Papillon" was included in B2 Music and Vibe Asian hip hop and rap compilation album Urban Asia Vol. 1, which was released worldwide on 9 May. Wang also featured in one of the four exclusive tracks, "Can't Breathe" by Eddie Supa, together with Stan Sono. On 14 May, his solo track "X" for Snow Beer superX was released. In August 2018, Wang was awarded the Next Big Thing award at that year's Teen Choice Awards. Also that month, Wang collaborated with Sammi Cheng on the single "Creo En Mi."

On 22 October 2018, Wang signed with Canxing Culture to enter the international market. On 6 November 2018, Wang released a single, "Different Game", featuring Gucci Mane. On 18 December, Madame Tussauds Hong Kong announced the creation of Wang's wax figure, which was unveiled on 30 July. On 14 January 2019, he was appointed as the new ambassador of Fendi China. On 23 March 2019, Wang held a birthday party titled "328 Journey Festival" at the Beijing Olympics Sports Center. The 5,000 tickets were sold out in 98 seconds.

On 12 June 2019, Wang was featured on the song "Rumble" from the album Diaspora by GoldLink and Lil Nei. Then he collaborated with Qin Fen, and released the single "Another" on 19 June 2019. On 20 July, Fendi launched its first ever velvet collection called "Fendi X Jackson Wang Capsule Collection". The limited edition collection, for which Jackson designed clothes, shoes and accessories, sold out immediately after the launch. It was then released worldwide on 26 July.

On 12 September 2019, Wang held a listening session of his first album Mirrors for the press: the digital record, which expresses the emotions of the contemporary youth and incorporates elements of China's traditional culture, was produced in China, South Korea, and the United States. Wang supervised the whole process, from the initial creation to the packaging, and was personally involved in arrangements, lyrics writing, and music video shooting. The album's first single, "Bullet to the Heart", was released on 24 September with a music video directed by Daniel Cloud Campos. The song debuted at number 1 on the Billboard China chart. The album's second single was "Dway!", published on 22 October with its music video. On 25 October, Wang's first album, Mirror, was released, reaching number 32 on the Billboard 200. It became the highest-charting debut album for a Chinese artist in the history of the chart. In conjunction with the release of Mirrors, the singer and artist Da Yan created an interactive video installation space titled Bullet to the Heart: 0328 at the LOVE LOVE LOVE Art of Love Exhibition at Shum Yip Upperhills Tower 1 in Shenzhen from 24 October to 3 November.

On 11 October 2019, leading up to the release of Mirrors, Wang was featured in three tracks from 88rising's album Head in the Clouds II: "Tequila Sunrise", "Walking", and "I Love You 3000 II". On 12 December 2019, he was featured on the song "Face Power" from the album Mr. Enjoy Da Money, a solo album by Higher Brothers' KnowKnow.

On 24 January 2020, Wang appeared on the stage of CCTV New Year's Gala for the first time and performed "The Beginning of Youth". On 20 March, Wang released a new self-written single, "100 Ways", mixing western and Chinese culture. The single became the first song by a Chinese and K-pop solo artist to debut on Mediabase's U.S. Top 40 radio chart. It entered the chart in May, ranking 39th, and maintained its spot with a steady rise, ranking #24 on 19 July.

In July 2020, Wang appeared as a mentor on the Youku competition series, Street Dance of China. On 7 July, he launched his fashion brand Team Wang Design, for which he served as the designer and creative director, after three years of development. The first collection titled "The Original" was presented with a pop-up store in Shanghai on 18 July, and made available in China and North America through pop-up stores. He went on to release a limited capsule collection with StockX in September.

On 4 September, Wang released the EDM single "Pretty Please", a collaboration with Swedish duo Galantis. Wang was behind the whole planning and editing of the music video, which pays homage to Hong Kong's love movies from the 90s, and directed it with Conglin. On 5 September, it was announced that Wang had invested in esports organization Victory Five. The same month, a collaboration project between Team Wang and the Monet exhibition in Shanghai was announced, in which Wang gave his own interpretation of the painting "Impression, Sunrise". The new painting, mixing Paris architecture with Shanghai's, was displayed in a concept space unveiled on 17 September and printed on a limited Team Wang collection consisting of t-shirt, jacket and vest, which was released on 31 October. In December, Team Wang Design expanded into the lifestyle sector.

In December 2020, Wang released the Chinese-language single, "Should've Let Go", with JJ Lin. That month, he also appeared at the KBS Song Festival, performing alongside Jessi for a rendition of her song "NUNU NANA." In 2020, he ranked 41st on Forbes China Celebrity 100 list. He is the fastest Chinese artist to reach 10 million views on Vevo.

2021–present: Departure from JYPE, Panthepack, and Magic Man 
Wang left JYP Entertainment on 19 January 2021, along with other Got7 members after their exclusive contracts expired. Since then, Team Wang currently operates his international activities. There were reports alleging Wang had also partnered with Sublime Artist Agency, which the latter later confirmed on 22 January. Later that month, he released the self-produced Chinese single, "Alone."

In March 2021, Wang terminated his working relationship with Adidas, after their previously made public statement regarding alleged forced labour in the cotton-producing region of Xinjiang resurfaced. 

In March 2021, Wang was featured on three new singles: "Magnetic" by Rain, "So Bad" by Vava, and "M.I.A." by Afgan. On March 26, he released his new English single, "LMLY", along with a self-directed 90s Hong Kong movie-inspired music video. The song was included in Teen Vogue's list of the best K-pop songs of 2021. In April 2021, Wang performed "LMLY" at the Harper's Bazaar Fashion Icons Party, where he was named the "Musician of the Year." Wang made his U.S. late-night television debut with the single on April 21, performing it live on The Late Late Show With James Corden. Also in April, Wang performed "DNA" on the Mango TV reality competition series, Sisters Who Make Waves In June 2021, Wang ranked in the top 10 on Forbes China Celebrity 100 list and was listed on Tatler Hong Kong Asia's Most Influential individuals in the culture field. In July of that year, Wang appeared on an episode of Go Fridge, and began serving as a mentor on the Tencent variety show, Girls Like Us. Wang's remix of Rich Brian, NIKI, and Warren Hue's "California" was also released in July.

On July 29, another English single, "Drive You Home", was released in collaboration with Internet Money. The self-directed and self-written cinematic music video features Wang acting himself in a reversed timeline plot. In August 2021, Wang announced hip hop group Panthepack under his label Team Wang, consisting of himself as one of the members, along with rapper Ice, J.Sheon, and Karencici. Their single "Buzz" was released on August 28, 2021, followed by their 10-track debut album, The Pack, in September 2021. Throughout 2021, Wang was honored with numerous awards, including "Best Male Artist of the Year" at the NetEase Indie Music Awards, "Most Influential Male Singer in Asia" at the Chinese Top Ten Awards, and "Best Original Music Award" for the single "Alone" at the Global Chinese Music event.

On March 31, 2022, he released the new single "Blow", which precedes the release of his full album Magic Man. On April 16, he performed at Coachella with "100 Ways", "Blow" and the unreleased song "Cruel". On July 12, 2022 he held a one-hour long show at Rajamangala Stadium, opening the football match between Manchester United and Liverpool. He also partnered with the Singapore Tourism Board for the SingapoReimagine global marketing campaign.

Magic Man was released on September 9, 2022, and debuted at No. 15 on the Billboard 200 in the USA, also ranking third on the Top Album Sales and on the Top Current Album Sales. The album was promoted through a world tour that started in Bangkok on November 26, selling out shows in Bangkok, Kuala Lumpur, Singapore, London and Paris. After the Asian and European stops, the tour continued in North America, Mexico and South America.

Personal life 
Because of his work in the entertainment industry in China, Korea and the rest of the world, Jackson is proficient in a number of languages; he can fluently speak and understand Mandarin, Cantonese, Korean and English.

In August 2019, Wang uploaded a photo of the Chinese flag and declared himself as "one of 1.4 billion guardians of the Chinese flag" on his official Weibo account, after a Chinese flag was removed and tossed into the Victoria Harbour during the 2019-20 Hong Kong protests. In a January 2020 interview with Forbes, Wang introduced himself as "Jackson Wang from China" and stated: "My goal is just to put my name out on the table just to let everybody to get to know me. I want to ... let people know that Chinese kids are working on good music too."

Discography

 Mirrors (2019)
 Magic Man (2022)

Filmography

Television series

Variety shows

Awards and nominations

Forbes

References

External links

 Jackson Wang  on Vevo
 Jackson on JYP Publishing

1994 births
Living people
Got7 members
21st-century Hong Kong male singers
Fencers at the 2010 Summer Youth Olympics
Sportspeople of Chinese descent
Male actors of Chinese descent
Hong Kong expatriates in South Korea
Hong Kong male film actors
Hong Kong male singers
Hong Kong male television actors
Hong Kong male rappers
Hong Kong male sabre fencers
Hong Kong television presenters
JYP Entertainment artists
K-pop singers
Chinese K-pop singers
Korean-language singers of China
Korean-language singers of Hong Kong
Weekly Idol members